Möhringen may refer to several places in south-western Germany:
Möhringen (Stuttgart), part of Stuttgart
Möhringen an der Donau, a village on the River Danube in the district of Tuttlingen
Möhringen (Unlingen), part of Unlingen